Writers' homes (sometimes writer's, author's or literary houses) are locations where writers lived. Frequently, these homes are preserved as historic house museums and literary tourism destinations, called writer's home museums, especially when the homes are those of famous literary figures. Frequently these buildings are preserved to communicate to visitors more about the author than their work and its historical context. These exhibits are a form of biographical criticism. Visitors of the sites who are participating in literary tourism, are often fans of the authors, and these fans find deep emotional and physical connections to the authors through their visits.

Sites include a range of activities common to cultural heritage sites, such as living history, museum exhibits, guided tours and poetry readings. New York Times commentator Anne Trubek counted 73 such houses in the United States.

The tradition of preserving houses or sites important to famous authors has a long history: in the 14th century Petrarch's birthplace was preserved, despite Petrarch barely spending time there as a child. In the late nineteenth and early twentieth century France, photojournalism which represented authors homes created an increased public interest in writers' private lives, making their homes destinations.

The public popular imagination around these literary homes is a central theme of the satirical novel An Arsonist's Guide to Writers' Homes in New England.

Notable homes 

 Jane Austen's House Museum
 Brontë Parsonage Museum
 Green Hills Farm (Pearl S. Buck)
 Mikhail Bulgakov Museum: Kyiv, Moscow
 Robert Burns Cottage
 Newstead Abbey (Lord Byron)
 Thomas Carlyle's House
 Casa de Cervantes
 Melikhovo and White Dacha (Anton Chekhov)
 Greenway Estate (Agatha Christie)
 John Clare Cottage
 Manning Clark House
 Jean Cocteau House
 Coleridge Cottage (Samuel Taylor Coleridge)
 Cowper and Newton Museum (William Cowper)
 Osamu Dazai Memorial Museum
 Charles Dickens Museum
 Emily Dickinson Museum
 Château de Monte-Cristo (Alexandre Dumas)
 Rowan Oak (William Faulkner)
 Anne Frank House
 Elizabeth Gaskell's House
 Goethe's House and Birthplace
 Edward Gorey House
 Thomas Hardy's Cottage and Max Gate
 Ernest Hemingway House and Cottage
 James Herriot's home
 Maison de Victor Hugo
 Dr Samuel Johnson's House and Birthplace
 John Keats House and Keats–Shelley House
 Bateman's (Rudyard Kipling)
 Tarkhany (Mikhail Lermontov)
 Lope de Vega's house
 Arrowhead (Herman Melville)
 Milton's Cottage (John Milton)
 Margaret Mitchell House and Museum
 Rozhdestveno Estate (Vladimir Nabokov)
 La Sebastiana (Pablo Neruda)
 Monte Cristo Cottage (Eugene O'Neill)
 Edgar Allan Poe House and Museum
 Hill Top (Beatrix Potter)
 Abbotsford (Sir Walter Scott)
 Shakespeare's Birthplace
 Shandy Hall (Laurence Sterne)
 Harriet Beecher Stowe House (Brunswick, Cincinnati, Hartford)
 Farringford House (Alfred, Lord Tennyson)
 Dylan Thomas Boathouse
 James Thurber House
 Yasnaya Polyana (Leo Tolstoy)
 Mark Twain House
 Strawberry Hill House (Horace Walpole)
 The Mount (Edith Wharton)
 Highbury (Patrick White)
 Walt Whitman House
 Monk's House (Virginia Woolf)
 Dove Cottage and Rydal Mount (William Wordsworth)
 Yr Ysgwrn (Hedd Wyn (Ellis Humphrey Evans))

See also
:Category:Literary museums

References

Further reading 
 
 
 

 
 Prottas, Nathaniel. "Beyond the Cult of the Author: The Literary Museum Today". Journal of Museum Education 45, no. 3 (2020): 221–25.